Paul Dunn (born July 7, 1960) is a former American football offensive guard and coach. He played college football at the University of Pittsburgh.

College career
Dunn was a three-year letterman as an offensive guard for the Pittsburgh Panthers from 1978 to 1982.

Coaching career

University of Pittsburgh
Dunn started coaching as a graduate assistant for the Pittsburgh Panthers in 1983.

Pennsylvania State University
Dunn was a graduate assistant for the Penn State Nittany Lions from 1984 to 1985.

Edinboro University of Pennsylvania
Dunn served as offensive line coach for the Edinboro Fighting Scots from 1986 to 1988.

Rutgers University
Dunn was offensive line coach for the Rutgers Scarlet Knights in 1989.

University of Maine
Dunn served as offensive line coach of the Maine Black Bears from 1990 to 1993.

University of Cincinnati
Dunn was offensive line coach for the Cincinnati Bearcats from 1994 to 1995.

Vanderbilt University
Dunn served as offensive line coach of the Vanderbilt Commodores from 1996 to 1997.

Kansas State University
Dunn was running game coordinator and offensive line coach for the Kansas State Wildcats from 1998 to 2002.

University of Kentucky
Dunn served as running game coordinator and offensive line coach of the Kentucky Wildcats from 2003 to 2004.

University of Pittsburgh
Dunn was  offensive line coach of the Pittsburgh Panthers from 2005 to 2007.

Atlanta Falcons
Dunn served as assistant offensive line coach of the Atlanta Falcons from 2008 to 2011 and offensive line coach from 2012 to 2013. He was dismissed by the Falcons on December 30, 2013.

Houston Texans
Dunn was offensive line coach for the Houston Texans in 2014. He was dismissed by the Texans on January 8, 2015.

References

Living people
1960 births
American football offensive guards
Pittsburgh Panthers football players
Pittsburgh Panthers football coaches
Penn State Nittany Lions football coaches
Edinboro Fighting Scots football coaches
Rutgers Scarlet Knights football coaches
Maine Black Bears football coaches
Cincinnati Bearcats football coaches
Vanderbilt Commodores football coaches
Kansas State Wildcats football coaches
Kentucky Wildcats football coaches
Atlanta Falcons coaches
Houston Texans coaches
Players of American football from Philadelphia
Sportspeople from Philadelphia
Coaches of American football from Pennsylvania
European League of Football coaches